Evangelion is the ninth studio album by Polish extreme metal band Behemoth. The album was released on 7 August 2009 through Nuclear Blast Records, and on 11 August 2009 through Metal Blade Records in the United States.

Background 

The album title refers to the Good News in Christianity; the message of Jesus Christ.

The album's cover artwork is a depiction of The Great Harlot of Babylon, the figures of evil mentioned in the Book of Revelation in the Bible.

Recording and production 
In January 2009, the band was in the final stages of the songwriting and rehearsal process for the album. Behemoth entered Radio Gdańsk studio in Poland to begin work on the album on 16 February 2009. The band managed to tap Daniel Bergstrand (Meshuggah, In Flames, Dark Funeral) to produce drums on the record. Bergstrand used some unconventional techniques—a big room for the drums to create ambience and 22-channel recording for a more "organic and natural" sound.

In March they were close to finish recording the guitars, with help from Wojciech and Sławomir Wiesławski from Studio Hertz. Within five days they completed three songs and laid down three rhythm guitars on each side, after which they worked on the bass, solos and vocals simultaneously.

The band also managed to tap Colin Richardson to mix the album. The band had tried to book him before for their previous album, The Apostasy, but he wasn't available then.

In early May, tracking was completed and on 12 May Nergal flew to the United Kingdom to join Colin Richardson to mix the record at Miloco Studios, London. Also in May, Metal Hammer was given the opportunity to listen to three fully completed songs in Miloco Studios. Nergal stated that this was the most relaxing and at the same time the most creative studio session he had ever been a part of.

Track listing 
All lyrics written by Nergal, except where noted. All music composed by Nergal.

Credits 
Writing, performance and production credits are adapted from the album liner notes.

Personnel

Behemoth 
 Nergal – vocals, guitars
 Inferno – drums, backing vocals on "Daimonos"
 Orion – bass, backing vocals on "Daimonos"

Session musicians 
 Seth – guitars, backing vocals on "Daimonos"

Additional musicians 
 Siegmar – samples, synthesizer
 Hevelius Brass quintet
 Pawel Hulisz – trumpet
 Piotr Kowalkowski – trumpet
 Michal Szczerba – horn
 Bogdan Kwiatek – trombone
 Lukasz Gruba – tuba
 Boris "Hatefrost" Kalyuzhnyy – backing vocals on "Daimonos"
 Maciej "Manticore" Gruszka – backing vocals "Daimonos"
 Arkadiusz Malczewski – backing vocals "Daimonos"
 Tomasz "Ragaboy" Osiecki – sitar on "Shemhamforash"
 Maciej Maleńczuk – spoken word on "Lucifer"

Production 
 Behemoth – production
 Daniel Bergstrand – co-production
 Sławomir Wiesławski – co-production
 Wojciech Wiesławski – co-production
 Colin Richardson – co-production, mixing
 Arkadiusz Malczewski – engineering
 Janusz Bryt – engineering
 Kuba Mańkowski – engineering
 Ted Jensen – Audio mastering

Visual art 
 Nergal – cover concept
 Tomasz Daniłowicz – cover concept, cover design, artwork, mask design
 Macifj Boryna – photography
 Grupa13 – photography
 Kasjopea Michorowska – costume design
 Behemoth – make up
 Gellaturo – mask

Studios 
 RG Studios, January 2009 E.V. - May 2009 – recording
 Musikbox, Miloco Studios, London, May 2009 – mixing
 Mastered in Sterling Studio, New York, May 2009 – mastering

Charts

Release history

References 

2009 albums
Behemoth (band) albums
Metal Blade Records albums
Nuclear Blast albums
Polish-language albums
Mystic Production albums
Albums produced by Adam Darski